Bonabeh-ye Maraq (also Romanized as Bonābeh-e Maraq) is a village in Babaafzal Rural District, Barzok District, Kashan County, Isfahan Province, Iran. At the 2006 census, its population was 38, in 12 families.

References 

Populated places in Kashan County